Dough and Dynamite is a 1914 American comedy silent film made by Keystone Studios starring Charlie Chaplin.

Plot 
The story involves Chaplin and Chester Conklin working as waiters at a restaurant. Charlie is especially inept and his comic carelessness enrages the customers. The workers in the restaurant's bakery go on strike for more pay, but are fired by the unsympathetic proprietor. Charlie is put to work in the bakery where his lack of skills upsets his boss and co-worker Chester Conklin. Meanwhile, the vengeful strikers have arranged to smuggle a loaf of bread concealing a stick of dynamite into the bakery. During a free-for-all involving Charlie, Chester, and their boss, the dynamite dramatically explodes. At the end of the film, Charlie emerges groggily from a pile of sticky dough.

Mack Sennett's recollections
In Mack Sennett's 1954 autobiography, King of Comedy, he recalled he was absent from Keystone Studios for most of the filming of Dough and Dynamite. Before Sennett left, he put Chaplin and Conklin jointly in charge of creating a new comedy with basically no guidelines. The two comedians began creating a film in which each man was a roominghouse boarder competing against one another in trying to woo the landlady, but they abandoned the idea after a short time. When they saw a "help wanted" sign outside a local bakery, the idea of a slapstick comedy set within a bakery came to both men almost simultaneously. Sennett claimed, however, that it was his idea to have a stick of dynamite concealed in a loaf of bread. Sennett declared Dough and Dynamite to be Chaplin's breakout film with Keystone.

Reviews
The New York Dramatic Mirror praised Chaplin's efforts in Dough and Dynamite, writing, "In a comparatively short time, Charles Chaplin has earned a reputation as a slapstick comedian second to none. His odd little tricks of manner and his refusal to do the most simple things in an ordinary way are essential features of his method, which thus far has defied successful imitation."

Moving Picture World commented, "Two reels of pure nonsense, some of which is very laughable indeed. Chas. Chaplin appears as a waiter in a French restaurant and bakery. He has a terrible time breaking dishes and getting the dough over the floor. The bakers go on strike and at the last the whole place is blown up by dynamite. This is well-pictured and very successful for this form of humor."

Cast
 Charles Chaplin - Waiter
 Chester Conklin - Jacques
 Fritz Schade - Monsieur La Vie, Bakery Owner
 Norma Nichols - Mme. La Vie, the Baker's Wife
 Glen Cavender - Head baker
 Cecile Arnold - Waitress
 Vivian Edwards - Customer
 Phyllis Allen - Customer
 John Francis Dillon - Customer
 Edgar Kennedy - Striking baker
 Slim Summerville - Striking baker
 Charley Chase (as Charles Parrott) - Customer
 Wallace MacDonald - Customer
 Jess Dandy - Female Cook
 Ted Edwards - Striking Baker (uncredited)

External links
 DoughandDynamite on Internet Archive
 
 

1914 films
Short films directed by Charlie Chaplin
American black-and-white films
Silent American comedy films
American silent short films
1914 comedy films
Keystone Studios films
Films produced by Mack Sennett
Articles containing video clips
1914 short films
American comedy short films
1910s American films